Cerocala sokotrensis is a moth of the family Erebidae.

Distribution
It is found in Yemen (Sokotra).

References
Hampson, G. F. 1899c. The expedition to Sokotra. VI. Descriptions of one new genus and fourteen new species of moths. - Bulletin of the Liverpool Museums 2(2):35–39, pl. 1.

Fauna of Yemen
Ophiusina
Insects of the Arabian Peninsula